Coventry Very Light Rail (CVLR) is a light rail tram system proposed to operate in Coventry, England. The system has been promoted as being the first of its kind in the United Kingdom. When finished, it will also be the first tram network to operate in Coventry since the Second World War.

Plans to establish such a system were first revealed during 2016; development work was headed by the Warwick Manufacturing Group (WMG) and Transport Design International (TDI). It was designed to be substantially cheaper to establish than conventional tramways and light railways, making use of batteries to avoid installing expensive overhead line equipment along much of the route, along with a new, thinner track system that is easier to install and repair. The vehicle is standard UK gauge, so would be compatible with other networks.

During early 2018, WMG started formalising its procurement arrangements with various industrial partners to complete development and produce the vehicle. Construction of the first prototype vehicle has been completed. During 2019, it was announced that the first line of the system was planned to be operational by 2024. Further expansion of the network is intended after this point to cover various commercial, residential, and industrial districts of Coventry, as well as linking up with other transit hubs.

Background
Proposals for Coventry to adopt this technology were first publicly revealed during 2016. The concept for this mass transit system originated from the Warwick Manufacturing Group (WMG), an institution that is closely associated with the University of Warwick; much of the system's early development was performed by the group prior to other entities becoming involved. In January 2018, WMG commenced its procurement process, in which various industry partners were selected to develop and produce aspects of the vehicle. During June 2018, it was announced that WMG had awarded a contract to the Stratford-upon-Avon based transport specialist  Transport Design International (TDI). In accordance with this selection, TDI has been assigned overall responsibility for the design and manufacture of the vehicles, working in close cooperation with WMG to do so.

Further elements of the system have been contracted to numerous third parties. Tikab & Arogus will perform both the design and manufacture of both the bogies and the control systems. Transcal is responsible for producing miscellaneous metal fabricated elements, along with the seating and interior fittings. Transport for West Midlands (TfWM) had been appointed to as the lead authority on all operational aspects of the system. That same month, it was suggested that an initial section of the system, running between the railway station and the city centre, could open as early as 2021,.

During early 2019, it was announced that development of the system had reached an advanced stage, along with an initial route and launch date. It is reportedly scheduled for the first demonstrator vehicle to be completed by autumn 2020, after which it will be subject to a series of tests in advance of its delivery during the following year. Testing will be conducted at the Very Light Rail National Innovation Centre in Castle Hill, Dudley, West Midlands. It has been speculated that early passenger-carrying services could commence as early as 2021 while a full service would follow two or three years later.

Technology
The concept of 'Very Light Rail' (VLR) has been developed as a means of delivering a light rail system at a much lower cost and with much reduced construction times than traditional tramways or light rail systems. This will allow for such systems to be rolled out across smaller towns and cities so they can gain benefits of a tram system at a considerably more affordable cost. The system had reportedly been engineered for compatibility with the existing West Midlands Metro mass transit network. It has been envisioned that services upon the network could be operated upon a 'turn up and go' frequency at a typical interval of every three to four minutes, rather than using a timetable.

Vehicles
The VLR concept uses lightweight vehicles, each typically accommodating 50 passengers; of these 20 will be seated while 30 will have to stand. It has been proposed for these vehicles to eventually be operated autonomously. Guidance is to be primarily achieved from its rails. The vehicle are primarily composed of steel and aluminium, while also incorporating several composite components. The vehicles are to be equipped with batteries; when combined with rapid charging systems, the need for overhead line equipment to be installed throughout the route is dispensed with, resulting in reduced installation costs. Being electrically powered, it produces zero emissions and is therefore an environment-friendly means of transportation.

Track
A major feature of the system is the track, which is prefabricated. This is relatively lightweight and shallower than traditional tramway track, enabling it to be laid over existing utilities and thus avoiding the need for these to be relocated, requiring less excavation; all of these factors make it quicker and cheaper to install. If required, the track can be dismantled and reused at other locations, being held together by a series of clips; this feature has also been promoted for ease of maintenance. The track is seated upon slabs, the materials of which can comprise a high-strength foam core with a recycled plastic coating.

Network and funding
The first proposed route for the system is from Coventry railway station to the University Hospital Coventry and Warwickshire via Coventry city centre. This route is proposed to be operational by 2024. Another proposed route would link the railway station with the University of Warwick. In the long term, the city council has intentions to construct a total of four routes which are intended to connect the major residential, industrial and commercial areas across the city, as well as a direct connection to the HS2 station near Birmingham Airport via Kenpas Highway & (possibly) Allesley. Furthermore, it is hoped that the successful demonstration of the technology at Coventry will give developers and planners elsewhere confidence to deploy their own networks at other locations.

The scheme has been included in a wider £15 billion plan to reshape mass transit in the West Midlands. £2.4 million of funding for its development has been sourced from the British Government's Local Growth fund through the Coventry and Warwickshire Local Enterprise Partnership (CWLEP). An additional £12.2 million was secured from the devolution deal for the West Midlands Combined Authority (WMCA). Additional backing may come from private enterprises, efforts to secure such partnerships commenced during late 2019. It has been stated that the cost of building the system will equal £7 million per kilometre, which is substantially less than the £35-60 million per kilometre of traditional tram systems.

Vehicles

The vehicle (yet to be named) will carry up to 50 passengers in total with 20 seated. The first vehicle left the production line in March 2021, and was taken on a showcase tour before being taken to Dudley for testing. With the low capacity, the vehicles will operate at a frequency of every 5–6 minutes, with the Hourly Capacity being quadruple the capacity of the existing bus system in the city. There are plans to implement autonomous technology to bring frequencies up to every 3–4 minutes, this will most likely only occur if trams become overcrowded (which is expected).

See also
 Coventry Corporation Tramways - the historic tramway system in Coventry which ceased operation in 1940.
 Light rail
 West Midlands Metro - another tramway system in the West Midlands.
 Parry People Movers

References

External links
 Coventry City Council page about the system
 University of Warwick page about the system
 Very Light Rail Innovation Centre

Rail transport in Coventry
Tram transport in England
Proposed railway lines in England
2024 in rail transport